Rhinelepis strigosa is a species of armored catfish native to Argentina, Brazil, Paraguay and Uruguay where it occurs in the Paraná and Uruguay River basins.  This species grows to a length of  SL.

References
 

Hypostominae
Fish of South America
Fish of Argentina
Fish of Brazil
Fish of Paraguay
Fish described in 1840